Jenifer Yaël Juliette Dadouche-Bartoli (born 15 November 1982), known by the mononym Jenifer, is a French singer.

Since winning the first season of Star Academy France in 2002, she has had a number of hit singles on the French, Belgian and Swiss charts.

Biography
Jenifer Bartoli was raised with her younger brother Jonathan, by her mother and father, Michel Dadouche and Christine Bartoli. Her mother is part Corsican-Italian and part Belgian; her father is a Jewish Algerian. She comes from a modest background. She participated in the Graines de star television broadcast in 1997, but this was a failure.

Jenifer decided to go to Paris and attend the casting for the first series of Star Academy France, which went on to become a huge hit on French television. She was selected, and eventually won. The hit single "J'attends l'amour" (I'm waiting for love) soon followed.
After the tour with her band that followed her victory, she toured as a solo artist from October 2002 until January 2003, and eventually performed at the Paris Olympia, which she had dreamed of as a child.

Her debut self-titled album went on to sell over three-quarters of a million copies. The album featured a song written by Marc Lavoine and a duet with fellow Star Academy student Mario. The second single "Au Soleil" became one of the "tubes de l'été" (Summer hits) of 2002 in France. The album was re-released later to include two new tracks: "Entre Humains" and "Des Mots Qui Résonnent". The latter became her third top ten single in France and Jenifer stated that it was more her style of music, being more pop/rock. Finally a fourth song, the ballad "Donne Moi Le Temps" was released. The re-released album sold over a million copies.

In 2004 Jenifer returned onto the scene with her second, more personal, melancholy album "Le Passage". Among others, this album contained songs written by Calogero, Kyo, Tina Arena and one song Jenifer co-wrote. This album contains the singles "Ma Révolution" (My Revolution), "Le Souvenir De Ce Jour" (The Memory of This Day), "C'est De L'Or" (It's Golden) and "Serre Moi" (Hold me). The album was supported by an extensive tour across France and was followed by the release of a live album "Jenifer Fait Son Live" and an accompanying DVD. 

She has stated that she also wants to produce music in English outside France.

In November 2010, Jenifer released her fourth studio album called "Appelle-moi Jen" (Call Me Jen), which charted at number 13 in France. It's a pop/rock-electronical album which has a 1980s French song lookalike. The first single of the album, "Je danse"(I Dance), was released in September 2010. This song was a hit in France and also in Belgium, rising to the 3rd position in the charts.

In 2012, she is a The Voices coach (with Florent Pagny, Garou and Mika) for TF1.

In 2002, Jenifer met French musician and songwriter, Maxim Nucci in studio when she was working on her debut album, and they started dating soon after. On 5 December 2003, she gave birth to their son, Aaron at only 21. However, they called it quits in February 2008 after almost six years of dating.

In July 2013, Jenifer started dating French actor Thierry Neuvic. After months of speculations, Jenifer announced in April 2014 that she is 5 months pregnant with her second child. She gave birth to their son, Joseph, on 13 August 2014. In January 2016, it was publicly revealed that Jenifer and Neuvic were no longer together.

She began dating Corsican businessman Ambroise Fieschi in April 2016, and the two were married on 21 August 2019 in Serra-di-Ferro, Corsica.

 Philanthropy 
Jenifer is a member of the Les Enfoirés charity ensemble since 2003.

In 2006, she also became an active patron of the charity "Chantal Mauduit" that helps kids from Kathmandu, Nepal.

She's also involved in the French charity "Rêves" that enables sick kids to realise their dreams.

In 2012, she sold her Chantal Thomass corset on Vestiaire Collective and managed to raise €8000 for the Telethon, a famous French charity aiming to help people with neuromuscular diseases.

 Awards 
 NRJ Radio's NRJ Music Awards :
 Best French newcomer (2003)
 Best French album  (2005)
 Best French female artist (2004, 2005, 2006, 2008, 2009, 2011)
 MTV Europe Music Awards
 Best French artist (2005)

Discography

Albums

Studio albums

Live albums

SinglesNotes'

Filmography

References

External links
  Jenifer's official site
  Biography of Jenifer, from Radio France Internationale

1982 births
Living people
French people of Algerian-Jewish descent
French people of Belgian descent
French people of Italian descent
French people of Corsican descent
People from Nice
Star Academy winners
Star Academy (France) participants
Jenifer
21st-century French singers
21st-century French women singers
MTV Europe Music Award winners